Mazi Smith (born June 16, 2001) is an American football defensive tackle for the Michigan Wolverines.

Early life and high school career
Smith was born on June 16, 2001. He attended East Kentwood High School in Kentwood, Michigan. He was rated by ESPN as the No. 38 recruit in the Class of 2019 and the year's second best defensive tackle.

College career
During the 2021 season, Smith started all 14 games for Michigan. He had 37 tackles, 2-1/3 tackles for loss, four pass breakups, and four quarterback hurries.

In August 2022, Bruce Feldman of The Athletic rated Smith No. 1 on his annual list of college football "freaks". Feldman cited Smith's size (over 325 pounds), speed (shuttle time of 4.41 seconds and three-cone drill time of 6.94 seconds), and his "rare power and agility". Feldman called Smith "so rare, in fact, it's hard to find the right superlative to begin with." He was also credited with being the vocal leader of Michigan's 2022 defense. At the end of the season, he was selected as a first-team player on the 2022 All-Big Ten Conference football team. 

On October 7, 2022, Smith was stopped for speeding by police in Ann Arbor and was arrested after a gun was found in his possession without a concealed pistol license (CPL). Two months after his arrest, he was charged with carrying a concealed weapon, a felony. That count was dismissed on December 8, 2022, during a hearing as part of his guilty plea on the lesser charge of a loaded firearm in a motor vehicle.

References

External links
 Michigan Wolverines bio

2001 births
Living people
American football defensive tackles
Michigan Wolverines football players
People from Kentwood, Michigan
Players of American football from Michigan